The Argent Centre is a Grade II* listed building on the corner of Frederick Street and Legge Road in the Jewellery Quarter of Birmingham, England.

Designed by J. G. Bland for W. E. Wiley, a manufacturer of gold pens; it was built in 1863, and acquired the name Albert Works, possibly because it was opposite the Victoria Works of Joseph Gillott.

This was a common arrangement at the time allowing natural light to reach workbenches from two sides. With floors constructed of hollow bricks tied with wrought iron, it was fireproof, removing the need for insurance. The multicoloured brickwork decorates a design reminiscent of renaissance Florence. Recycled steam from the works engines went to a Turkish bath in the northern end of the building; visitors to the Turkish Baths, also indulged in other leisure activities there, such as chess, fencing and billiards. Presently flat-roofed, it originally had pyramids on each corner tower. Plans are in-hand to restore the pyramidal roofs. A bomb dropped into the courtyard at some time during the Birmingham Blitz of World War II, and the bent window frames were visible at least till the mid-1980s.

It was home to Griffin & George, scientific equipment supplier to schools and universities, as well as Gallenkamp, laboratory equipment suppliers, part of the Fisons Scientific Equipment Division until their move to London in 1983/4. The technical staff, sales and marketing personnel, draughtsmen and prototype engineers were housed there. It was converted to offices in 1993.

The Argent Centre formerly Albert Works is owned by Midlands Industrial Association Ltd a Community Benefit Company whose aims and objectives are to encourage employment through the growth of the small firms sector by redeveloping redundant buildings in inner city brownfield sites. Midlands Industrial Associations Ltd is managed and run by Prince, Warnes Ltd. a specialist managed workspace consultancy. The Argent Centre provides workspace on a risk free monthly licence to give people the chance to develop their businesses without the risks normally associated with renting commercial property.
Among many other businesses, The Argent Centre is now home to the independent museum, The Pen Museum
The only museum in the United Kingdom devoted to the history of the pen making industry - find out why Birmingham became the centre of the world pen trade.
'
Midlands Industrial Association Ltd has 4 other properties developed and run by Prince, Warnes Ltd, The Telsen Centre. 55, Thomas Street, Aston, Birmingham. The Jubilee Centre, 130, Pershore Street, in Birmingham's China Town.  FiFty Seven Frederick Street, in Birmingham's Jewellery Quarter and The Chubb Buildings, Fryer Street, Wolverhampton.

References

The Jewellery Quarter – History and Guide, Marie Elizabeth Haddleton, 1987, 
Pevsner Architectural Guides - Birmingham, Andy Foster, 2005, 
The Birmingham Jewellery Quarter - An Architectural Survey of the Manufactories, John Cattell, Sheila Ely, Barry Jones, English Heritage, 2002, 

Buildings and structures in Birmingham, West Midlands
Grade II* listed buildings in the West Midlands (county)